"Set You Free" is a single by American blues rock duo The Black Keys from their second album, Thickfreakness. It was recorded in Patrick Carney's basement at his old house in Akron, Ohio. The song appears in the film School of Rock (2003) and the soundtrack album, as well as in the film I Love You, Man.

Usage in media
Although The Black Keys had always refused to allow their music to be used for commercialism, for fear of being branded "sell-outs", they decided to license "Set You Free" for use in a Nissan advert. Dan Auerbach later said, "It's helped us immensely. Before "Tighten Up", we'd never had a real song regularly played on rock radio. We didn't have that support, and getting these songs in commercials was almost like having your song on the radio."

The track was also included on the soundtrack to the film School of Rock (2003).

Track listing 
All songs written by Dan Auerbach and Patrick Carney, unless otherwise noted.
 "Set You Free"
 "Hard Row" (lyrics by Dan and Chuck Auerbach)
 "Evil" (previously unreleased)

Personnel 
Dan Auerbach - vocals, guitars
Patrick Carney - drums and percussion

References

The Black Keys songs
2003 songs
Songs written by Dan Auerbach
Songs written by Patrick Carney